Southern Angami II Assembly constituency is one of the 60 Legislative Assembly constituencies of Nagaland state in India. It is part of Kohima District and is reserved for candidates belonging to the Scheduled Tribes. The constituency is also a part of the Nagaland Lok Sabha constituency. As of 2018, 17504 eligible voters were registered in the constituency.

Members of Legislative Assembly

Election results

2023

Previous results

See also 
 List of constituencies of the Nagaland Legislative Assembly
 Southern Angami I Assembly constituency

References

Viswema
Kohima district
Assembly constituencies of Nagaland